The Welsh Rugby Union Division Four South East (also called the SWALEC Division Three South East for sponsorship reasons) is a rugby union league in Wales.

Competition
There are 12 clubs in the WRU Division Three South East. During the course of a season (which lasts from September to May) each club plays the others twice, once at their home ground and once at that of their opponents for a total of 22 games for each club, with a total of 132 games in each season. Teams receive four points for a win and two point for a draw, and additional bonus win is awarded to either team if they score four tries or more in a single match. No points are awarded for a loss though the losing team can gain a bonus point for finishing the match within seven points of the winning team.  Teams are ranked by total points, then the number of tries scored and then points difference. At the end of each season, the club with the most points is crowned as champion. If points are equal the tries scored then points difference determines the winner. The team who is declared champion at the end of the season is eligible for promotion to the WRU Division Three South East. The two lowest placed teams are relegated to the WRU Division Five South East.

Sponsorship 
In 2008 the Welsh Rugby Union announced a new sponsorship deal for the club rugby leagues with SWALEC valued at £1 million (GBP). The initial three year sponsorship was extended at the end of the 2010/11 season, making SWALEC the league sponsors until 2015. The leagues sponsored are the WRU Divisions one through to seven.

 (2002-2005) Lloyds TSB
 (2005-2008) Asda
 (2008-2015) SWALEC

2011/2012 Season

League teams
 Abercwmboi RFC
 Barry RFC
 Bridgend Sports RFC
 Llandaff North RFC
 Llandaff RFC
 Llantwit Major RFC
 Nantymoel RFC
 Penygraig RFC
 Pontyclun RFC
 Pontycymmer RFC
 Porth Harlequins RFC
 Wattstown RFC

2011/2012 table

2010/2011 Season

League teams
 Abercwmboi RFC
 Barry RFC
 Cardiff HSOB RFC
 Llandaff RFC
 Llantwit Major RFC
 Nantymoel RFC
 Pontyclun RFC
 Porth Harlequins RFC
 Rhiwbina RFC
 St. Joseph's RFC
 Tonyrefail RFC
 Treherbert RFC

2010/2011 table

2009/2010 Season

League teams
 Abercwmboi RFC
 Cardiff HSOB RFC
 Dowlais RFC
 Ferndale RFC
 Llantwit Major RFC
 Nantymoel RFC
 Pontyclun RFC
 Pontycymmer RFC
 Porth Harlequins RFC
 Rhiwbina RFC
 Taffs Well RFC
 Tonyrefail RFC

2009-10 table

2008/2009 Season

League teams
 Abercwmboi RFC
 Cardiff HSOB RFC
 Cefn Coed RFC
 Dowlais RFC
 Ferndale RFC
 Heol y Cyw RFC
 Llantwit Major RFC
 Pentyrch RFC
 Porth Harlequins RFC
 Senghenydd RFC
 Taffs Well RFC
 Tonyrefail RFC

2008-09 table

2007/2008 Season

League teams
 Abercwmboi RFC
 Aberdare RFC
 Barry RFC
 Cardiff HSOB RFC
 Cefn Coed RFC
 Cilfynydd RFC
 Dowlais RFC
 Ferndale RFC
 Llantwit Major RFC
 Llandaff North RFC
 Pentyrch RFC
 Taffs Well RFC

2007/2008 Table

References

6
Sports leagues established in 1995
1995 establishments in Wales